Mercuriade (14th-century) was an Italian physician, surgeon and medical author. She is one of the few woman physicians known from the Middle Ages.

Mercuriade was a student of the University of Salerno and belonged to the minority of female students of her time period. She was the author of the treaties De Febre Pestilenti (on Crisis in Pestilent Fever), De Curatio (The Cure of Wounds) and De Ungentis (on Ungentis). Her work was included in the Collectio Salernitana. 

She is considered one of the "ladies of Salerno" along with Abella, Rebecca Guarna, and Francesca de Romana who attended the medical school in Salerno from its beginning and helped usher in a "'medical renaissance'" in Europe.

References

External links 
 Walsh JJ. 'Medieval Women Physicians' in Old Time Makers of Medicine: The Story of the Students and Teachers of the Sciences Related to Medicine During the Middle Ages, ch. 8, (Fordham University Press; 1911)
 Howard S. The Hidden Giants, ch. 2, (Lulu.com; 2006)

Year of birth missing
Year of death missing
Italian surgeons
Medieval women physicians
14th-century Italian physicians
Schola Medica Salernitana
14th-century Italian women
14th-century Italian writers
Medieval surgeons
14th-century Latin writers